Ibn Haldun University, IHU,, is a university in Istanbul.

History 
IHU was established by the TÜRGEV Foundation (Turkey Youth and Education Services Foundation), set up by Recep Tayyip Erdogan in 1996 when he was Mayor of Istanbul Metropolitan Municipality. The Rector is Professor Dr. Atilla Arkan.

In December 2019, IHU set up a four year project to improve the understanding of the work of Al-Tirmidhi. It also held a seminar to celebrate the work of Fuat Sezgin.

Faculty

The history department includes prominent scholars such as Halil Berktay and Suraiya Faroqhi. 
Erik Ringmar is a professor in the department of politics and international relations.
Ramazan Aras is a professor and head of the sociology department.

Campus

The university is located in Başakșehir, in the western outskirts of Istanbul, where a new campus opened in the fall of 2020.

Schools
 School of Law
 School of Business
 School of Education
 School of Islamic Studies
 School of Communication
 School of the Humanities and Social Sciences

The various languages of instruction of Ibn Haldun University are Turkish, English, and Arabic, and are under the remit of the School of Languages.

Academic activities 
The school of humanities and social sciences include the following departments:

 Department of History
 Department of Sociology
 Department of Economics
 Department of Psychology
 Department of Comparative Literature
 Department of Political Science and International Relations

Institutes of the University 
 Medeniyetler İttifakı Enstitüsü (Alliance of Civilizations)
 Educational Science Institute
 Social Sciences Institute

References

 
2015 establishments in Turkey